Jon Rahm Rodríguez  (born 10 November 1994) is a Spanish professional golfer. He was the number one golfer in the World Amateur Golf Ranking for a record 60 weeks and later became world number one in the Official World Golf Ranking, first achieving that rank after winning the Memorial Tournament in July 2020. In June 2021, Rahm became the first Spanish golfer to win the U.S. Open.

Early life and amateur career 
Rahm was born on 10 November 1994 in Barrika, Basque Country, Spain.

As an amateur he represented Spain on different levels and was part of the Spanish teams winning the 2011 European Boys' Team Championship and the 2014 European Amateur Team Championship. At the 2014 Eisenhower Trophy he was the individual leader.

He attended Arizona State University on a golf scholarship, where he earned a Bachelor of Arts degree in Communications. There he won 11 college golf tournaments, which is second in school history, behind only Phil Mickelson's 16 collegiate wins. 

Rahm won the Ben Hogan Award in 2015 and 2016, the first player to win it twice. He was also the leading individual at the 2014 Eisenhower Trophy. He competed in the 2015 Phoenix Open as an amateur during his junior year, finishing tied for fifth place, three shots behind the winner. On 1 April 2015, Rahm became the 28th player to be the No. 1-ranked golfer in the World Amateur Golf Ranking. His first stint was for 25 consecutive weeks, after which he surrendered it, regained it, and held it for an additional 35 weeks. His total of 60 weeks spent atop the ranking is the all-time record. While ranked No. 1 in the world, he advanced to the quarterfinals of the 2015 U.S. Amateur before losing to Derek Bard.

He won the Mark H. McCormack Medal in 2015 as the leading player in the World Amateur Golf Ranking, which qualified him for the following year's U.S. Open and Open Championship. He closed out his collegiate career by winning the Pac-12 Conference championship and an NCAA regional championship before finishing tied for third in the national championship. He was the low amateur at the 2016 U.S. Open, finishing his final tournament as an amateur in a tie for 23rd place at 7-over-par.

Professional career

2016
After the U.S. Open, Rahm turned professional, which meant that he forfeited his exemption into the 2016 Open Championship. The next week Rahm played in his first event as a pro at the Quicken Loans National. He held or shared the lead for the first two rounds and finished tied for third place, four strokes behind the winner, Billy Hurley III. The finish was enough for Rahm to regain entry into The Open, as the Quicken Loans National was part of the Open Qualifying Series. Rahm finished tied runner-up in the RBC Canadian Open, securing Special Temporary Member status for the remainder of the season. He gained enough points as a non-member to earn a PGA Tour card for 2017.

2017
In late January 2017, Rahm won the Farmers Insurance Open with a 60-foot eagle putt on the final hole to notch his maiden PGA Tour title. He jumped from 137th to 46th in the Official World Golf Ranking with the win, and also gained entry into the Masters Tournament, The Players Championship, the PGA Championship, and World Golf Championships events. On 2 March, Rahm played in his first World Golf Championships event at the WGC-Mexico Championship where he shot rounds of 67-70-67-68 (−12) to finish T3, two strokes behind winner Dustin Johnson. 

In his second WGC event, the WGC-Dell Technologies Match Play, Rahm was runner-up to Dustin Johnson in the championship match. Rahm debuted as the No. 21-seed in the field of 64 and went 3−0 in round-robin play, defeating Kevin Chappell 3 & 2, Shane Lowry 2 & 1, and countryman Sergio García 6 & 4. He continued his domination in the round of 16 with a second consecutive 6 & 4 win over Charles Howell III, and then bested that mark when he eliminated Søren Kjeldsen 7 & 5 in the quarterfinals. In the semifinals, he defeated Bill Haas 3 & 2, which set up his rematch with Johnson, who was attempting to win his third straight tournament. In the final, Rahm was 5-down after just 8 holes, but won holes 9, 10, 13, 15, and 16 to get to only 1-down going into the 18th. Both players made par on the final hole of the match and Rahm finished runner-up in his WGC-Match Play debut, which allowed him to ascend to a new career-high world ranking of 14th.

Rahm finished tied for 27th place in his first Masters and then finished 4th in the Wells Fargo Championship and joint runner-up in the Dean & DeLuca Invitational, results which lifted him into the top-10 of the World Rankings. Making his debut in a European Tour event, he finished tied for 10th in the Open de France and, the following week, he earned his first European Tour victory by winning the Dubai Duty Free Irish Open by six strokes.

Rahm finished the regular season in sixth place in the FedEx Cup rankings. He had top-10 finishes in all four of the FedEx Cup Playoff events and finished fifth in the final standings.

Rahm won the DP World Tour Championship, Dubai, the final event of the 2017 European Tour season. He was awarded the European Tour Rookie of the Year for finishing as the highest-ranked rookie in the Race to Dubai. However, some of his fellow European Tour pros such as Richard Bland suggested that the award should have gone to a more committed member of the tour. Outside the majors and WGCs, Rahm had played just four regular season European Tour events.

2018
Rahm started 2018 by finishing runner-up eight strokes behind Dustin Johnson at the Sentry Tournament of Champions in Kapalua, Hawaii.

Later in the month, Rahm won the CareerBuilder Challenge after a sudden death playoff with Andrew Landry, for his second career PGA Tour victory. After matching scores on the first three extra holes, Rahm prevailed with a birdie on the fourth extra hole. The win lifted Rahm to a then career high 2nd in the world rankings. This made it four wins in just 38 professional starts for Rahm – a ratio bettered only by Tiger Woods in the past 30 years.

In his short professional career, Rahm has become renowned for his fiery on-course temper, which came to the fore during the final round of the Waste Management Phoenix Open, where he slammed his club into the ground.

In April 2018, Rahm won the Open de España on the European Tour.

In September 2018, Rahm qualified for the European team participating in the 2018 Ryder Cup. The European team won the Ryder Cup, defeating the U.S. 17.5 to 10.5 at Le Golf National outside of Paris, France.

On 2 December 2018, Rahm won the limited-field Hero World Challenge tournament in the Bahamas.

2019
On 28 April 2019, Rahm won the Zurich Classic of New Orleans on the PGA Tour with partner Ryan Palmer.

On 16 June 2019, Rahm finished tied for 3rd at the U.S. Open at Pebble Beach Golf Links in Pebble Beach, California.

On 7 July 2019, Rahm won the Dubai Duty Free Irish Open at Lahinch Golf Club. Rahm trailed 54-hole leader Robert Rock by five shots heading into the final 18 holes of the tournament. Beginning the round at eight-under overall, Rahm registered four birdies on the front nine to make the turn at 11-under overall and three-under 31 for the day. The 2017 Irish Open champion then shot five-under 31 on the back nine, including four birdies and an eagle, to close out the two-stroke victory.

On 6 October 2019, Rahm won his second consecutive Open de España at Club de Campo in Madrid. Rahm entered the final round with a five-shot lead and maintained that advantage with a final round 66, 5-under, to finish on 22 under 262.

On 24 November 2019, Rahm won the season-long Race to Dubai title on the European Tour with a victory at the DP World Tour Championship, Dubai. He also won the European Tour Golfer of the Year award.

2020
On 19 July 2020, Rahm won the Memorial Tournament, lifting him to number one in the Official World Golf Ranking. He was the second Spaniard after Seve Ballesteros to be number one in the world. His reign as the number one golfer lasted two weeks, until Justin Thomas overtook him with victory in the WGC-FedEx St. Jude Invitational. 

On 30 August 2020, Rahm won the BMW Championship, the second tournament of the FedEx Cup Playoffs. Rahm shot a 64 in the final round and defeated Dustin Johnson in a playoff by making a 66-foot putt on the first playoff hole.

2021: First major victory
On 4 January 2021, it was announced that Rahm had signed a multi-year agreement with Callaway Golf Company, ending his association with TaylorMade that began when he turned professional.. The deal included all equipment and clothing.

In June, Rahm was forced to withdraw as the defending champion from the Memorial Tournament due to a positive COVID-19 test. At the time of the withdrawal, he had completed the third round with a six-stroke lead. On 20 June at Torrey Pines, Rahm finished with two birdies on the final two holes to win his first major tournament at the U.S. Open. He dedicated his win to the late Spanish golfer Seve Ballesteros.

In July, after a tie for third finish at the Open Championship, Rahm prepared to travel to Tokyo to prepare for the competition at the 2020 Summer Olympics. While taking his third and final COVID-19 test before departing, Rahm again tested positive, forcing him to withdraw from the event. Jorge Campillo replaced Rahm in the field.

In August, Rahm shot rounds of 63-67-67 to share a tie for the lead alongside Cameron Smith at The Northern Trust. A final round of 70 saw him finish in solo-third and two shots shy of a playoff.

For his performance on the 2020–21 PGA Tour, Rahm won the PGA Player of the Year award presented by the PGA of America, as well as the Vardon Trophy and the Byron Nelson Award for lowest scoring average.

In September 2021, Rahm played on the European team in the 2021 Ryder Cup at Whistling Straits in Kohler, Wisconsin. The U.S. team won 19–9 and Rahm went 3–1–1 including a loss in his Sunday singles match against Scottie Scheffler.

2022
Rahm started off 2022 at the Sentry Tournament of Champions at Kapalua Resort in Hawaii. He shot 33 under par for four rounds including a 61 in the third round. This did break the original PGA Tour to par scoring record at 31 under par, however it was not good enough to win the tournament as Cameron Smith finished on 34 under par to take the title and eclipse the scoring record. Three weeks later at the Farmers Insurance Open, Rahm finished one shot out of the playoff between Luke List and Will Zalatoris, ultimately settling for a tied-third finish.

On 1 May, Rahm won the Mexico Open for his seventh career PGA Tour victory. In September, he shot a final-round 62, to finish tied-second at the BMW PGA Championship, one shot behind Shane Lowry. In October, Rahm won the Acciona Open de España, shooting a final-round 62 to win by six shots ahead of Matthieu Pavon. It was his third Open de España title, matching Seve Ballesteros. In November, Rahm won the European Tour's season-ending DP World Tour Championship. He won by two shots ahead of Tyrrell Hatton and Alex Norén. It was his ninth European Tour win and fifth Rolex Series win.

2023
Rahm began 2023 by shooting a final-round 63 at the Sentry Tournament of Champions to win by two shots ahead of Collin Morikawa. He made up a six shot deficit going into the final round. Two weeks later, he won The American Express, shooting 27-under-par for four rounds to beat Davis Thompson by one shot. The following week, Rahm was in contention to win the Farmers Insurance Open. He was two shots behind leader Sam Ryder going into the final round. However, a final round 74 saw him finish in a tie for seventh place. Two weeks later in his next appearance, Rahm finished third at the WM Phoenix Open. The week after, Rahm won the Genesis Invitational to reclaim the #1 ranking in the world. It was Rahm's fifth worldwide win in nine starts.

Personal life
Rahm's surname originates from a Swiss ancestor who moved to Spain in the 1780s; his father is Basque, while his mother is from Madrid.

Rahm is a keen supporter of the Basque football team Athletic Club Bilbao, and was honoured as the club's special guest at a game in December 2019.

Rahm lives in Scottsdale, Arizona with his American wife, Kelley, and their sons, born in 2021 and 2022.  

His nickname is Rahmbo.

Amateur wins
2010 Spanish Junior/Boys Championship
2011 Copa Baleares, Campeonato de Madrid Absoluto
2012 Campeonato de España Junior Y Boys, Campeonato Absoluto País Vasco, Bill Cullum Invitational
2014 ASU Thunderbird Invitational, Campeonato de España Absoluto, Bill Cullum Invitational, Eisenhower Trophy (individual leader)
2015 Duck Invitational, ASU Thunderbird Invitational, NCAA San Diego Regional, Campeonato de España Absoluto, Tavistock Collegiate Invitational
2016 ASU Thunderbird Invitational, Pac-12 Championships, NCAA Albuquerque Regional

Sources:

Professional wins (19)

PGA Tour wins (10)

PGA Tour playoff record (2–0)

European Tour wins (9)

The DP World Tour Championship is also a Rolex Series tournament.

Other wins (1)

Major championships

Wins (1)

Results timeline
Results not in chronological order in 2020.

LA = Low amateur
CUT = missed the half-way cut
"T" indicates a tie for a place
NT = No tournament due to COVID-19 pandemic

Summary

Most consecutive cuts made – 13 (2019 U.S. Open – 2022 Open Championship, current)
Longest streak of top-10s – 5 (2020 Masters – 2021 Open)

Results in The Players Championship

"T" indicates a tie for a place
WD = withdrew
C = Cancelled after the first round due to the COVID-19 pandemic

Results in World Golf Championships

1Cancelled due to COVID-19 pandemic

QF, R16, R32, R64 = Round in which player lost in match play
NT = No tournament
"T" = Tied
Note that the Championship and Invitational were discontinued from 2022.

PGA Tour career summary

Rahm was an amateur through the 2016 U.S. Open.

* As of the 2022 season

European Tour career summary

Note that there is double counting of starts, wins, finishes and money for majors and WGC tournaments between the PGA Tour and European Tour stats.
^ Rahm was an amateur through the 2016 U.S. Open.
* As of the 2022 season

Team appearances
Amateur
European Boys' Team Championship (representing Spain): 2011 (winners), 2012
Jacques Léglise Trophy (representing Continental Europe): 2011 
Bonallack Trophy (representing Europe): 2012 (winners)
European Amateur Team Championship (representing Spain): 2013, 2014 (winners), 2015
Palmer Cup (representing Europe): 2014 (winners), 2015
Eisenhower Trophy (representing Spain): 2014 (individual leader)

Professional
World Cup (representing Spain): 2016
Ryder Cup (representing Europe): 2018 (winners), 2021

Ryder Cup points record

See also
List of golfers with most European Tour wins

References

External links
 

Spanish male golfers
PGA Tour golfers
European Tour golfers
Winners of men's major golf championships
Ryder Cup competitors for Europe
Arizona State Sun Devils men's golfers
Golfers from the Basque Country (autonomous community)
Spanish expatriate sportspeople in the United States
Spanish people of Swiss descent
Sportspeople from Biscay
People from Mungialdea
Golfers from Phoenix, Arizona
1994 births
Living people